Muhammad ibn al-Qasim was an official of the Abbasid Caliphate who served briefly as vizier in July–October 933 under Caliph al-Qahir (r. 932–934). He hailed from a family of Nestorian Christian origin that had served in the caliphal bureaucracy since late Umayyad times, and was the son, grandson, great-grandson and brother of viziers.

Sources
 
 

9th-century births
10th-century deaths
Viziers of the Abbasid Caliphate
Banu Wahb

9th-century Arabs
10th-century Arabs